RONJA (Reasonable Optical Near Joint Access) is a free-space optical communication system originating in the Czech Republic, developed by Karel Kulhavý of Twibright Labs and released in 2001. It transmits data wirelessly using beams of light. Ronja can be used to create a 10 Mbit/s full duplex Ethernet point-to-point link. It has been estimated that 1000 to 2000 links have been built worldwide.

The device consists of a receiver and transmitter pipe (optical head) mounted on a sturdy adjustable holder. Two coaxial cables are used to connect the rooftop installation with a protocol translator installed in the house near a computer or switch.

Building instructions, blueprints, and schematics are published under the GNU Free Documentation Licence. Only free software tools are used in the development. The author calls this level of freedom "User Controlled Technology". Ronja is a project of Twibright Labs.

Manufacture 

The building instructions are written with an inexperienced builder in mind. Basic operations like drilling, soldering etc., are explained. Several techniques – drilling templates, detailed checks after soldering, testing procedures – are employed to minimize errors at critical places and help to speed up work. Printed circuit boards are downloadable ready for manufacture, with instructions for the fabhouse. People with no previous experience with building electronics have reported on the mailing list that the device ran on the first try.

154 installations worldwide have been registered into a gallery with technical data and pictures.

Range 
The dimmer but more affordable E4000 variant of HPWT-BD00 yields . The speed is always 10 Mbit/s full duplex regardless of the distance.

Models 

Connect with 8P8C connector into a network card or switch.
Connects to Attachment Unit Interface.
 Ronja Benchpress: A measurement device for developers for physical measurement of lens/LED combination gain and calculation of range from that
 Ronja Lopipe: The original (discontinued) design using red visible light and a RS232 interface for a max 115 kbit/s PPP/SLIP link.

Limitations 
By definition, clear visibility between the transmitter and receiver is essential. If the beam is obscured in any way, the link will stop working. Typically, problems may occur during conditions of snow or dense fog. One device weighs  and requires 70 hours of building time. It requires an ability to set full duplex manually on the network card or switch to take advantage of full duplex, since it doesn't support autonegotiation. Must be plugged directly into PC or switch using the integral  Ethernet cable.

Technology 

A complete RONJA system is made up of 2 transceivers: 2 optical transmitters and 2 optical receivers. They are assembled individually or as a combination. The complete system layout is shown in the block diagram.

Optical receiver – Preamplifier stage 

The usual approach in FSO (Free Space Optics) preamplifiers is to employ a transimpedance amplifier. A transimpedance amplifier is a very sensitive broadband high-speed device featuring a feedback loop. This fact means the layout is plagued with stability problems and special compensation of PIN diode capacitance must be performed, therefore this doesn't allow selection of a wide range of cheap PIN photodiodes with varying capacitances.

Ronja however uses a feedbackless design where the PIN has a high working electrical resistance (100 kilohms) which together with the total input capacitance (roughly 8 pF, 5 pF PIN and 3 pF input MOSFET cascode) makes the device operate with a passband on a 6 dB/oct slope of low pass formed by PIN working resistance and total input capacitance. The signal is then immediately amplified to remove the danger of contamination by signal noise, and then a compensation of the 6 dB/oct slope is done by derivator element on the programming pins of an NE592 video amplifier. A surprisingly flat characteristic is obtained. If the PIN diode is equipped with 3 kΩ working resistor to operate in flat band mode, the range is reduced to about 30% due to thermal noise from the 3 kΩ resistor.

Optical transmitter – Nebulus infrared LED driver 

The HSDL4220 infrared LED is originally unsuitable for 10 Mbit/s operation. It has a bandwidth of 9 MHz, where 10 Mbit/s Manchester-modulated systems need bandwidth of around 16 MHz. Operation in a usual circuit with current drive would lead to substantial signal corruption and range reduction. Therefore, Twibright Labs developed a special driving technique consisting of driving the LED directly with 15-fold 74AC04 gate output in parallel with RF voltage applied current-unlimited directly to the LED through large capacitors. As the voltage to keep the nominal LED average current (100mA) varies with temperature and component tolerances, an AC-bypassed current sense resistor is put in series with the LED. A feedback loop measures voltage on this resistor and keeps it at a preset level by varying supply voltage of the 74AC04 gates. Therefore, the nominally digital 74AC04 is operating as a structured power CMOS switch completely in analog mode.

This way the LED junction is flooded and cleared of carriers as quickly as possible, basically by short circuit discharge. This pushes the speed of the LED to maximum, which makes the output optical signal fast enough so that the range/power ratio is the same as with the faster red HPWT-BD00-F4000 LED. The side effects of this brutal driving
technique are: 1) the LED overshoots at the beginning of longer (5 MHz/1 MHz) impulses to about 2x brightness. This was measured to have no adverse effect on range. 2) A blocking ceramic capacitor bank backing up the 74AC04 switching array is crucial for correct operation, because charging and discharging the LED is done by short circuit. Under dimensioning this bank causes the leading and trailing edges of the optical output to grow longer.

Transceiver – Ronja Twister 

Ronja Twister is an electronic interface for free space optical datalink based on counter and shift register chips. It is a part of the Ronja design. It is effectively an optical Ethernet transceiver without the optical drive part.

The original design has been superseded with Twister2 but the logic circuit remained the same.

Open source hardware approach 

Soderberg, studying Ronja sociologically, writes: "Arguably, the first project that vindicated the methods and licensing schemes of free software development, applied those practices to open hardware development, and pulled off a state-of-the-art technology without any backing from universities or firms, was the Ronja project."

The whole toolchain is built strictly upon free tools and the source files are provided, free, under the GPL. This allows anyone to enter the development, start manufacture or invest into the technology without entry costs. Such costs normally can include software licence costs, time investment into resolution of compatibility issues between proprietary applications, or costs of intellectual property licence negotiations. The decision to conceive the project this way was inspired by observed organizational efficiency of Free Software.

On Christmas 2001, Ronja became the world's first 10 Mbit/s Free Space Optics device with free sources.

Examples of tools used in development:

 gEDA gschem (Schematic capture)
 QCAD
 BRL-CAD
 The PCB program
 Sodipodi for Vector graphics

See also 

Wireless community network
Visible light communication
List of device bandwidths

Notes

References 

 page 56
 Unstrung: Da Doo Ron RONJA
 Ronja talk at WSFII London 2005 (archive.org)
 Hack a Day: Ronja
 Building a Ronja-lightlink: A User Testimonial (web.archive.org)
 The 3D modeling software BRL-CAD, originally developed by the US Army since 1979, showcases Ronja as a project which uses BRL-CAD
 Phanumas Khumsat, Noppadol Wattanapisit, Karel Kulhavey, "Low-Cost Laser-Based Wireless Optical Transceiver for 10-Mbps Ethernet Link", Proceedings of IEEE Region 10 Conference (TENCON), Hong Kong, China (2006), which publishes the Ronja design with minor modifications, publishes the Ronja receiver and transmitter schematics virtually unchanged, and features a photograph of a Ronja Twister built on the official Ronja PCB.
 Phanumas Khumsat, Noppadol Wattanapisit, Karel Kulhavey, "Optical Front-Ends for Low-Cost Laser-Based 10-Mbps Free-Space Optical Transceiver" (full text), Proceeding of IEEE Asia Pacific Conference on Circuits and Systems 2006, 1911–1914 (2006), which publishes the Ronja design with minor modifications, publishes the Ronja receiver and transmitter schematics virtually unchanged, and features a photograph of the official Ronja optical heads and holders.
  I. Rukovanský, M. Horváth, L. Solárik, P. Cícha: Computer Networks (in Czech), a university lecture textbook, European Polytechnic Institute – a Private University, 2015, pages 66–67
 Johan Söderberg: Free software to open hardware: Critical theory on the frontiers of hacking, Doctoral Dissertation, University of Gothenburg, Sweden, 2011.
 David Němec: Cableless optical transmission (in Czech), Master diploma thesis, Institute of Telecommunications, Faculty of Electrical Engineering and Communication, Brno, Czech Republic, 2012.
 Santi Phasuk (สันติ ผาสุข): Design and Implementation of a Data Transceiver via Visible Light Beam (in Thai with English abstract), Master Thesis, Kasetsart University, Bangkok, Thailand, 2011. 
 B. Bakala: Realization of Optical Link, Bachelor project, Department of Telecommunication Engineering, Czech Technical University, Prague, Czech Republic, 2011.
 Jan Matyáš: FPGA-Based Ronja Twister (full text), Bachelor's Thesis, Department of Computer Systems, Faculty of Information Technology, Brno University of Technology, Czech Republic, 2011. 
 Bc. Lukáš Chobot: Wireless data transfer via optical modules (in Czech), Diploma Thesis, Faculty of Applied Computer Science, Tomas Bata University, Zlín, Czech Republic, 2011. 
 Bc. Filip Němec: Optical Cableless Transmittion (in Czech), Master's Thesis, Department of Telecommunications, Faculty of Electrical Engineering and Communication, Brno University of Technology, Czech Republic, 2010. 
 T. Szabo: Design and realization of wireless optical connection RONJA (mentioned in annual report), Master thesis, Department of Telecommunications, Faculty of Electrical Engineering and Information, Slovak University Of Technology in Bratislava, Slovakia, 2007.
 Bc. Ľubomír Adámek: Wireless Data Transmission (in Czech), Diploma Thesis, Faculty of Applied Computer Science, Tomas Bata University, Zlín, Czech Republic, 2006. 
 Libor Štěpán: Wireless Optical Link for LAN Ethernet (in Czech), Bachelor Thesis, Faculty of Applied Computer Science, Tomas Bata University, Zlín, Czech Republic, 2006. 
 M. A. Chancey: Short Range Underwater Optical Communication Links (full text), Master Thesis, North Carolina State University, USA, 2005.

External links 

 
 RONJA Adaptation for Underwater
 British council project – Promotion of ronja in community networks in UK 2004

Free software projects
Open hardware electronic devices
Physical layer protocols